Smitinandia is a genus of flowering plants from the orchid family, Orchidaceae. It contains three known species, native to Southeast Asia and the Himalayas.

Smitinandia helferi (Hook.f.) Garay - Indochina, Andaman Islands
Smitinandia micrantha (Lindl.) Holttum - Yunnan, Assam, Bhutan, Nepal, India, Bangladesh, Indochina, Borneo, Peninsular Malaysia
Smitinandia selebensis (J.J.Sm.) Garay - Sulawesi

See also
 List of Orchidaceae genera

References

External links

Vandeae genera
Aeridinae
Orchids of Asia